Nawab Khair Andesh Khan Sani was son of Nawab Khair Andesh Khan and belonged the illustrious family of the Kamboh Nawabs of Meerut. His original name was Muhammad Masih. He held a manasab of five thousand and the title of Nek Andesh Khan under Mughal Emperor Aurangzeb. Later under Emperor Bahadur Shah, he held six thousand mansab and received a title of Khair Andesh Khan. Khair Andesh Khan Sani built Khair Nagar in Bareilly and also built one Idgah, one Mubarak palace and many other buildings in Khair Nagar. He also waged war against king of Bundelkhand and reduced him to subjugation. His son was given the title of Nek Andesh Khan and a big fief or Jagir in Bareilly. His one brother Nawab Khairiyat Andesh Khan held a mansab of five thousand and remained governor of Kashmir where he constructed a Bazar known as Nawab Bazar. His second brother also got the title of Kheir Andesh Khan Salas during the reign of emperor Ahmed Shah Durani and also held the governorship of Kashmir.

References

See also
 Hasan Mahmudi Kamboh
 Kambojas
 Muslim Kamboh

Year of birth missing
Year of death missing
Medieval India
People from Meerut